Kunming–Bangkok Expressway is a proposed international expressway running from Kunming, Yunnan province, People's Republic of China, to Bangkok, Thailand via Laos The first expressway sections were opened in 2008.

It was jointly funded by China, Laos, Thailand and the Asian Development Bank.

It traverses jungle and highlands in southern Yunnan and Northern Laos before entering Thailand at Chiang Khong. It then continues southward, largely following Thai Route 1, which becomes an Expressway standard road near Bangkok but which is largely an at grade dual carriageway along most of its length within Thailand

The entire road is a non Expressway standard undivided 2 lane highway within Laos as of May 2019.

1Some distances on existing roads if expressway distances unavailable

Expressways also planned or under construction: Kunming to Mandalay (Burma) and Kunming to Hanoi (Vietnam).
Expressway completed between Vang Vieng and Vientiane in 2020.

See also
 Asian Highway Network AH1, AH2, AH3
 China National Highways
 Thai highway network
 Phahonyothin Road

References

External links
 UNESCAP - About the Asian Highway 

Expressways in China
Controlled-access highways in Thailand
Roads in Laos
Roads in Thailand
Transport in Yunnan
Kunming
Asian Highway Network